The Arizona Informant is an African-American owned newspaper located in Phoenix, Arizona. It is published weekly on Wednesdays to the entire state with a circulation of 15,000. It is the only African-American-owned newspaper in the state of Arizona.

History 
The Arizona Informant was started by brothers Cloves C. Campbell Sr. and Charles R. Campbell in 1971. The brothers began the newspaper as a response to the lack of information the African American residents of Arizona were given.

Cloves C. Campbell Sr. was the first black state senator for the state and spent his ten years in legislature fighting for the civil rights movement. Charles R. Campbell was an educator who had a master's degree in public administration and his doctorate in higher education. When the brothers started up the newspaper they chose to utilize it by creating a voice for the black community and remain informed on the matters of the community

Modern times 
Since the death of Cloves Campbell Sr. the newspaper has been taken over by Cloves Campbell Jr. The Arizona Informant remains the only black owned newspaper in Arizona.
In 2017, the Arizona Informant joined other black-led businesses and organizations in calling for the removal of Confederate monuments in Arizona.

References

Newspapers published in Arizona
Mass media in Phoenix, Arizona
African-American newspapers
Newspapers established in 1971
1971 establishments in Arizona